Ryan Hunter Palmer (born September 19, 1976) is an American professional golfer who plays on the PGA Tour.

Early life and amateur career
Born and raised in Amarillo, Texas, Palmer graduated from Amarillo High School in 1995. He played college golf at the University of North Texas (one year) and then transferred to Texas A&M University for his final three years and graduated in 2000.

Professional career
Palmer turned professional in 2000. He played on the mini-tours (Tightlies Tour and Hooters Tour) from 2000 to 2002. He played the Nationwide Tour in 2003, winning the Clearwater Classic and finishing 6th on the money list to earn his 2004 PGA Tour card.

Palmer's first career PGA Tour win came at the 2004 FUNAI Classic at the Walt Disney World Resort, with a three stroke victory over Briny Baird and Vijay Singh. Four years later, he earned his second career win during the PGA Tour Fall Series, at the 2008 Ginn sur Mer Classic where wet, rainy conditions made the course play tough all week. He won by making a ten-foot putt for birdie on the final hole on Sunday to finish seven under par and win by one stroke over five players. He was 143rd on the money list entering the week, but this win secured his playing status on Tour for 2009 and 2010.

In January 2010, Palmer won his third career PGA Tour title at the Sony Open in Hawaii. A final round 66 secured his victory by one stroke over Robert Allenby.

Palmer came close to winning a fourth career title at his hometown event the HP Byron Nelson Championship in Texas in May 2011. Palmer entered the final round leading by one stroke, but as the final round progressed in windy conditions he had to hole a birdie putt on the last to enter a playoff with Keegan Bradley. On the first playoff hole, the 18th, both players hit their tee shots out to the right amongst the trees. Bradley played his approach to just short of the green whereas Palmer hooked his approach shot into the water. Palmer pitched up close to the hole and made bogey but Bradley was able to win with a pitch and putt par.

In March 2014, Palmer lost another sudden-death playoff at the Honda Classic, after missing a five footer for what would have been the win on the 18th green in regulation play. He entered the four-man playoff, having been the only one to shoot an under-par final round. However, in the playoff, after missing the green in two, he could not get up and down, leaving Russell Henley to hole from three feet for victory. This was Palmer's second runner-up finish of the year, after finishing two shots behind Patrick Reed at the Humana Challenge in January 2014.

Palmer started the 2017–18 season on a Major Medical Extension under the family crisis provision as his wife underwent chemotherapy treatment. He met the terms of his medical extension at the CareerBuilder Challenge, then lost in a sudden-death playoff at the Farmers Insurance Open the following week. Trying to end an eight-year winless drought on tour, Palmer, playing in the final group, birdied the 72nd hole to join a playoff with Jason Day and Alex Norén. However, Palmer was eliminated at the first extra hole, as he could only make par to the others' birdies on the 18th.

In April 2019, Palmer won the Zurich Classic with teammate Jon Rahm.

Professional wins (5)

PGA Tour wins (4)

PGA Tour playoff record (0–3)

PGA Tour of Australasia wins (1)

1Co-sanctioned by the Nationwide Tour

Nationwide Tour wins (1)

1Co-sanctioned by the PGA Tour of Australasia

Results in major championships
Results not in chronological order in 2020.

CUT = missed the half-way cut
"T" = tied
NT = No tournament due to COVID-19 pandemic

Summary

Most consecutive cuts made – 5 (twice)
Longest streak of top-10s – 1 (twice)

Results in The Players Championship

CUT = missed the halfway cut
"T" indicates a tie for a place
C = Canceled after the first round due to the COVID-19 pandemic

Results in World Golf Championships
Results not in chronological order before 2015.

1Cancelled due to COVID-19 pandemic

QF, R16, R32, R64 = Round in which player lost in match play
NT = No tournament
"T" = tied
Note that the HSBC Champions did not become a WGC event until 2009.

See also
2003 Nationwide Tour graduates

References

External links

American male golfers
North Texas Mean Green men's golfers
Texas A&M Aggies men's golfers
PGA Tour golfers
Korn Ferry Tour graduates
Golfers from Texas
Amarillo High School alumni
Sportspeople from Amarillo, Texas
People from Colleyville, Texas
1976 births
Living people